Ferdinando Quaglia (1780-1853) was an Italian painter of portrait miniatures, who was active in the first years of the 19th century. He painted portraits of Marshal Junot and of the Empress Josephine.

References

1780 births
1853 deaths
19th-century Italian painters
Italian male painters
Portrait miniaturists
19th-century Italian male artists